Namrata Das is a veteran actress in Odia film Industry. She is well known for her supporting roles mostly as a mother or grandmother in many movies as well as in television series. She debuted in her first movie Dharitri in 1973 and she has been worked with more than 200 Odia film and 3 Bengali film since then. In January 2020 she receives ' Bhumi Kanya ' award for her four-decade-long contribution towards in the odia film industry. She is also the recipient of a state award for her versatile acting in the film Lakshmi Pratima.

Biography
She was born in Alapua village of Kendrapara district in a Zamindar family. her mother was dead when she was only 9 years old. She is elder in her family and has 4 sisters and 2 brothers.

Awards
1998: Best supporting actress for film Lakshmi Pratima.
2020: Bhumi Kanya awards for Odia film industry

Filmography

Television

References

Living people
1959 births
People from Kendrapara district
Actresses from Odisha
Indian film actresses
Indian television actresses
Indian soap opera actresses
Actresses in Odia cinema
Actresses in Odia television
20th-century Indian actresses
21st-century Indian actresses